Summer Stock is a 1950 American Technicolor musical film produced by Metro-Goldwyn-Mayer. It was directed by Charles Walters, stars Judy Garland and Gene Kelly, and features Eddie Bracken, Gloria DeHaven, Marjorie Main, and Phil Silvers. Musical numbers were staged by Nick Castle and Kelly.

Garland struggled with many personal problems during filming and Summer Stock proved to be her final film for MGM, as well as her last onscreen pairing with Kelly. By mutual agreement, MGM terminated Garland's contract in September 1950, something studio head L. B. Mayer said he later regretted doing.

Plot
Jane Falbury (Judy Garland) is a farm owner whose actress sister, Abigail (Gloria DeHaven), arrives at the family farm with her theater troupe. They need a place to rehearse, and Jane and her housekeeper, Esme (Marjorie Main), reluctantly agree to let them use their barn. The actors and actresses, including the director, Joe Ross (Gene Kelly), repay her hospitality by doing chores around the farm. Although Joe is engaged to Abigail, he begins to fall in love with Jane after Abigail leaves him in an angry fit. Similarly, although Jane is engaged to Orville (Eddie Bracken), she falls in love with Joe.

Highlights
The film's most famous scene is the now-classic final song-and-dance number "Get Happy" performed by Garland in a tuxedo jacket, black fedora, and black nylons to an arrangement by Skip Martin. It was choreographed by Charles Walters and filmed two months after the rest of the film, after Garland sought the help of a hypnotist in Santa Barbara and lost 20 pounds (9 kg). She performed it perfectly in just a couple of takes. According to New York Times critic Bosley Crowther Get Happy' finds Miss Garland looking and performing her best."

In another notable sequence, Kelly performs a solo dance in a darkened barn, using a newspaper and a creaky board as partners and props; the musical accompaniment reprises "You Wonderful You". The dance "turned out to be one of the breakthrough numbers" of his career.

In the film, Garland and Kelly share a dance duet, the swinging "Portland Fancy," where a square dance turns into a heated challenge dance for them.

Cast

 Judy Garland as Jane Falbury
 Gene Kelly as Joe D. Ross
 Eddie Bracken as Orville Wingait
 Gloria DeHaven as Abigail Falbury
 Marjorie Main as Esme
 Phil Silvers as Herb Blake
 Ray Collins as Jasper G. Wingait
 Nita Bieber as Sarah Higgins
 Carleton Carpenter as Artie
 Hans Conried as Harrison I. Keath

Songs
All songs were written by Harry Warren (music) and Mack Gordon (lyrics) except where noted. Orchestration chores were divided between Conrad Salinger and Skip Martin.

 "If You Feel Like Singing, Sing" – Garland
 "(Howdy Neighbor) Happy Harvest" - Garland and company stock members 
 "Dig-Dig-Dig Dig For Your Dinner" – Kelly, Silvers and company stock members 
 "Mem'ry Island" – Gloria DeHaven and Hans Conried (dubbed by Pete Roberts)
 "Portland Fancy" – (traditional New England contra dance tune) stock company members, Kelly and Garland
 "You Wonderful You" (Jack Brooks and Saul Chaplin, lyrics and Warren, music) – Kelly and Garland
 "Friendly Star" – Garland 
 "You Wonderful You"  – Kelly
 "All for You" (Chaplin) –  Kelly and Garland 
 "You Wonderful You" (Reprise) – Kelly and Garland
 "Heavenly Music" (Chaplin) – Kelly, Silvers and dogs
 "Get Happy" (Harold Arlen (music) and Ted Koehler (lyrics)) – Garland and chorus
 "(Howdy Neighbor) Happy Harvest" (finale) – Kelly, Garland, Silvers, and company stock members

'<small>Source<ref>[https://www.imdb.com/title/tt0043012/soundtrack Summer Stock' soundtrack listing] imdb.com, accessed July 22, 2009</ref></small>' Production Summer Stock was in the mold of the "unknown saves show" musical genre, Although Garland and Kelly were the stars originally announced by MGM in 1948 to appear in the film, in February 1949 the studio announced that Garland would be replaced by June Allyson. She was suspended in May 1949, during the filming of Annie Get Your Gun, and spent three months in a hospital in Boston being treated for drug dependence.  Betty Hutton replaced her on that film, but Garland was reinstated to the lead in Summer Stock, which was her first one following the suspension.

Kelly was not the first choice for the role: the producer, Joe Pasternak, originally wanted Mickey Rooney, but was prevailed on to go with Kelly because Rooney was no longer the box office draw he had once been. Busby Berkeley was originally slated to direct the film, but was replaced by Charles Walters before production began. He and Kelly worked on it as a favor to Garland, whose career needed a boost at the time, and Walters later complimented Kelly for the help he gave to Garland.  Kelly believed that he was miscast, because he was far too old for the role, and that the script was "a piece of crap." 

Principal photography began in November 1949. Garland had gained weight, and costume designer Walter Plunkett tried "to make her look as thin as possible, but we weren't miracle workers and we did not succeed." The filming was sometimes a struggle for Garland, who was facing many pressures in her personal life, aside from her heavy reliance on prescription medication,Soares, Emily. Summer Stock (article) TCM.com, accessed July 23, 2009 and she required frequent reassurance from Walters about her appearance and the quality of her performance. He later recalled that "flattery was food for her." She was frequently late during production of the film, and her behavior was erratic.  After filming began, Pasternak asked Mayer if he should abandon the film because of Garland's behavior, but studio head Louis B. Mayer insisted that she be given another chance. Mayer said: "Judy Garland has made this studio a fortune in the good days, and the least we can do is to give her one more chance. If you stop production now, it'll finish her."

The production was also beset by tension between Kelly and dance director Nick Castle, who almost came to blows at one time. The difficulties on the set caused Walters to later call the film "absolute torture" for him.   

Castle did not choreograph "You Wonderful You," "All for You", and "Portland Fancy" – these were done by Kelly – but did do "Dig-Dig-Dig Dig For Your Dinner" and other numbers. He also did not shoot "Get Happy," which was shot by Chuck Walters. Garland's work on the film ended in early February 1949, and it became evident to Walters that no "Garland payoff" appeared in the film. Garland agreed to appear for another week of filming, asked to sing "Get Happy," and wore the costume she wore in the "Mr. Monotony" number cut from Easter Parade. Garland had been treated by a hypnotist for weight loss and took off 15-20 pounds; she appears considerably thinner in the number.

In his biography of Walters, Get Happy, author Brent Phillips points out that production records belie subsequent claims that the "Get Happy" number was produced three months after production ended. The number was produced in March 1950, and production on other musical numbers continued through April.

After filming, Garland embarked on a long-promised vacation. Soon, however, she was called back to star with Fred Astaire and Peter Lawford in the film Royal Wedding, replacing June Allyson, who was pregnant. Once again, she struggled to perform in the face of exhaustion and overwork. She was fired from Royal Wedding, and her contract with MGM was terminated through mutual agreement.Green, p. 162

Overall, Summer Stock took six months to film, and was a box-office success.

Reception
According to MGM's records, during the film's initial release it earned $2,498,000 in the US and Canada and $859,000 overseas, resulting in a small $80,000 loss to the studio at the time. The film played to record audiences at the Capitol Theater in New York. Future playwright Edward Albee was at the theater at one performance, and later recalled that after the "Get Happy" number, "the audience watching the film was breathless for a moment and then, to a person, burst into sustained applause" as if it were a live performance.  

The film is recognized by American Film Institute in these lists:

 2004: AFI's 100 Years...100 Songs:
 "Get Happy" – #61
 2006: AFI's Greatest Movie Musicals – Nominated

In popular culture
The film, specifically the iconic "Get Happy" sequence, has been referenced in many pop culture contexts. Michael Jackson performed "Dangerous" in a way that paid tribute to the film, most notably at the 1993 American Music Awards and the 1995 MTV Video Music Awards. He and his dancers wore suits, and a dancer stood in front of him until the beginning of the song, just like in the film, in which Garland is covered by a dancer at first. Some excerpts from the song can be heard in his performance.

British singer Duffy's "Rain on Your Parade" music video was also inspired by that sequence, and she can be seen wearing an outfit similar to Garland's, and dancing against a white background along with some male dancers dressed in suits.

Actress Katie Holmes paid homage to Garland, performing "Get Happy" on the television show So You Think You Can Dance. She wore a similar outfit and danced alongside male dancers in suits in front of a match-painted background.

Drag queen and recording artist Alaska Thunderfuck's music video "Anus" pays homage to the "Get Happy" sequence. A scene in the video shows her in a blazer and tilted fedora, backed by two male dancers, dancing in a similar fashion to the original number. This is a tribute to Garland and the song's importance in the LGBT community.

References
 Citations 

 General and cited references 
 Frank, Gerold. Judy (1999), Da Capo Press, .
 Green, Stanley and Schmidt, Elaine. Hollywood Musicals Year by Year (1999), Hal Leonard Corporation, .
 Wayne, Jane Ellen. The Golden Girls of MGM'', (2003), Carroll & Graf Publishers, .

External links 
 
 
 
 
 "Summer Stock" on the Judy Garland Online Discography,

1950 films
1950 musical comedy films
1950s screwball comedy films
American musical comedy films
American romantic comedy films
American screwball comedy films
American romantic musical films
Films about musical theatre
Films directed by Charles Walters
Films produced by Joe Pasternak
Films set in Connecticut
Metro-Goldwyn-Mayer films
Films with screenplays by George Wells
1950s English-language films
1950s American films